Benjamin B. Martin (1883 – 1932) was an artist. He made his living in Seattle, Washington, where he worked as an illustrator for the Seattle Times, and later in New York, where he worked as a commercial artist. One of his lasting legacies was his work as a member of the Seattle Cartoonists' Club, in the club's book The Cartoon; A Reference Book of Seattle's Successful Men.

Background

Martin was born and grew up in Fargo, North Dakota, the son of John Finley Dair Martin and Elizabeth "Lizzie" L. Brown, one of three children. His father moved the family to Minneapolis Minnesota about 1897. He married his first wife Lydia Mary Garrison when he was 26, on August 2, 1909 in Victoria, British Columbia, Canada.

Joy and tragedy in Seattle
He and his wife Lydia moved to Seattle, and she died January 14, 1911, the same year his work for the cartoonists' club was published. He stayed in Seattle, reporting to the draft board that he was an artist for the Seattle Times in 1918.

He married again, to Cora Lucinda Davidson, and they had twin girls Ellen Jane Martin and June Dair Martin, born May 14, 1916. Cora died from tuberculosis fifteen months later on August 3, 1917 in Spokane, Washington. Benjamin continued living in Seattle, with an aunt, Pleiades Martin, and raising his daughters; they were together in January 1920 for the Census. Eleven months after that his daughter Ellen died on December 6, 1920. After Ellen's death, Martin's family life "fell apart" and he and a fellow artist, Jack Bechdolt, hit the road as "Soldiers of Fortune". June was shipped off to Oakland, California, where she joined her grandparents.

New York
Martin eventually ended up in New York City, where he established himself again as an illustrator. As his fortunes improved, he asked his parents, along with his daughter June, to live with him in the city. His mother, Elizabeth, died in New York City on November 6, 1923, and the family "fell apart" again. Ben and his friend Jack, hit the road again, leaving his daughter June in the care of his father. The state eventually decided to "take June [his remaining daughter] out of circumstances and sent her to the Hope Farm school" Verbank, New York, about 1927.  They never reunited.

In 1930, Brown reported to the federal census that he was living as a roomer in New York, working as a commercial artist. He spent the last years of his life as a hobo, according to his grandson, and died in 1932 in Bloomington, Illinois. The death certificate there listed him as a sign painter.

Works
The Cartoon; A Reference Book of Seattle's Successful Men, Frank Calvert (ed.), Metropolitan Press, Seattle, 1911.

References

American editorial cartoonists
American caricaturists
American illustrators
Artists from Seattle
1883 births
1932 deaths
People from Fargo, North Dakota
People from North Dakota